Muirchertach Nár mac Guairi (died 668) was a possible King of Connacht from the Ui Fiachrach Aidhne branch of the Connachta. He was the son of Guaire Aidne mac Colmáin (died 663), famous in Irish sagas.

The Irish king lists such as contained in The Book of Leinster do not list Muirchertach as king but have instead Cenn Fáelad mac Colgan (died 682) as the successor to Guaire. Only the Chronicum Scotorum of the Irish annals mentions him as king of Connacht in his death obit. A number of annals record the death of his brother Cellach in 666 however during the plague years.

The Annals of Innisfallen records an event under the year 665 in which the Connachta fought a battle with the Munstermen at Loch Fén (Loughfane, Limerick, Co.) but there is no mention of who won or whether it was fought by the Connachta or just the Ui Fiachrach Aidhne.

Notes

See also
Kings of Connacht

References
 Chronicum Scotorum
 Annals of Innisfallen
 T.M.Charles-Edwards, Early Christian Ireland
 Francis J. Byrne, Irish Kings and High-Kings
 Book of Leinster, Section 30
 The Chronology of the Irish Annals, Daniel P. McCarthy

External links
CELT: Corpus of Electronic Texts at University College Cork

668 deaths
Kings of Connacht
People from County Galway
7th-century Irish monarchs
Year of birth unknown